The 14th Tank Brigade is a reserve armored formation of the Ukrainian Ground Forces.

History

Formation
The brigade was formed in 2015. On 28 December 2015, brigade held readiness exercise and was ready for service.

David Axe writing for Forbes, suggested that Brigade was inactive in August 2022. The brigade was also not mentioned by President Volodymyr Zelenskyy in his 200 day of war speech.

Gallery

References

Brigades of the Ukrainian Ground Forces
Armoured brigades of Ukraine